Altarejos may refer to:

Places
Altarejos, a municipality in Cuenca, Castile-La Mancha, Spain. 

de Altarejos 
Mota de Altarejos, a municipality in Cuenca, Castile-La Mancha, Spain
Fresneda de Altarejos, a municipality in Cuenca, Castile-La Mancha, Spain

People with the surname
Joselito Altarejos, Filipino filmmaker